The Supreme Court of Samoa is the superior court dealing with the administration of justice in Samoa.

It was established by Part VI of the Constitution of Samoa. It consists of the Chief Justice of Samoa and other judges as appointed by the Head of State on the advice of the Prime Minister of Samoa. Judges serve until they reach the age of 68 years, and can only be removed from office on the address of the Legislative Assembly on grounds of misbehaviour or infirmity; this requires a two-thirds majority of all MPs. Acting Judges may be appointed for a fixed term.

The court has jurisdiction over the interpretation of the constitution, enforcement of fundamental rights, and membership of the Legislative Assembly of Samoa. It also has "such original, appellate and revisional jurisdiction as may be provided by Act". At present this is criminal jurisdiction where there is a statutory maximum sentence of more than seven years and a civil jurisdiction where the amount claimed is more than $20,000. It can hear both civil and criminal appeals from the District Court of Samoa. In 2020 the jurisdiction of the court was amended by the Land and Titles Bill to exclude review of any decision falling within the jurisdiction of the Land and Titles Court of Samoa.

Decisions of the Supreme Court can, with leave of the court, be appealed to the Court of Appeal of Samoa. The Court of Appeal consists of the Chief Justice and the other judges of the Supreme Court, but a judge cannot sit on an appeal from their own decision.

Judges

The court is made up of the following judges:
 Chief Justice Satiu Simativa Perese
 Justice Vui Clarence Nelson
 Justice Mata Tuatagaloa
 Justice Tafaoimalo Leilani Tuala-Warren
 Justice Fepuleai Ameperosa Roma
 Justice Leiataualesa Daryl Clarke

In addition, former Justice Lesatele Rapi Vaai was reappointed for a period of 12 months in November 2020.

On 4 August 2021 five former New Zealand judges were appointed as acting judges for a term of two years:
 Justice Robert Fisher
 Justice Peter Blanchard
 Justice Rhys Harrison
 Justice Rodney Hansen
 Justice Raynor Asher

References

Law of Samoa
Samoa